Saint-Brice-sous-Rânes (literally Saint-Brice under Rânes) is a commune in the Orne department in north-western France.

See also
Communes of the Orne department

References

Saintbricesousranes